Chionobosca is a genus of moths of the family Crambidae. It contains only one species, Chionobosca actinopis, which is found in Australia, where it has been recorded from the Northern Territory.

References

Schoenobiinae
Crambidae genera
Taxa named by Alfred Jefferis Turner
Monotypic moth genera